Austral 20 may refer to:

 The Austral 20 (catamaran), a catamaran built by Charles Cunningham
 The Austral 20 (trailer sailer), a small sailboat built by Austral Yachts